Alghisi is an Italian surname. Notable people with the surname include:

 Galasso Alghisi (1523–1573), Italian architect and author 
 Luciano Alghisi (1917–2004), Italian football player
 Paris Francesco Alghisi (1666–1733), Italian organist

Italian-language surnames